Lignerolles is a commune in the Indre department in central France.

Population

Sights
 Castle of Puybardeau (1830)

Personalities
The Maussabré family, with famous French military chiefs along the centuries.

See also
Heugnes
Communes of the Indre department

References

Communes of Indre